Fc receptor-like protein 1 is a protein that in humans is encoded by the FCRL1 gene.

References

Further reading

Fc receptors